Christopher Stabb (born 12 October 1976) is an English footballer, who plays for Bradford Park Avenue.

Career
Born in Bradford, Chris Stabb began his footballing career in the Bradford City academy. In 1997, he moved to neighbours Farsley Celtic but joined Ossett Town in 1998. He re-joined Farsley Celtic in 2002 where he has played ever since.

He was the club's captain for a few years before fellow defender Carl Serrant took the armband. Stabb experienced the club's rise up the leagues featuring three promotions in four years. He missed the club's 2007–08 season in the Conference National due to a knee injury which threatened his future in football. Stabb made his return to the team on 14 September in a friendly against Sheffield United.

References

External links

1976 births
English footballers
Bradford City A.F.C. players
Farsley Celtic A.F.C. players
Bradford (Park Avenue) A.F.C. players
English Football League players
Living people
Footballers from Bradford
Ossett Town F.C. players
Association football defenders